Skunk Works is an official trademark for the Lockheed Martin Advanced Development Programs (formerly Lockheed Advanced Development Projects).

Skunkworks or Skunk works may also refer to:

 Skunkworks (album), alternative rock album by Bruce Dickinson
 Skunkworks project, a project typically developed by a small and loosely structured group of people who research and develop a project primarily for the sake of innovation

See also
 SCO Skunkware, a collection of open source software